France Križanič (3 March 1928 – 17 January 2002) was a Slovene mathematician, author of numerous books and textbooks on mathematics. He was professor of mathematical analysis at the Faculty of Mathematics and Physics of the University of Ljubljana.

Križanič won the Levstik Award twice, in 1951 for his book Kratkočasna matematika (Maths for Fun) and in 1960 for Križem po matematiki and Elektronski aritmetični računalniki (Criss Cross Across Maths and Electronic Calculators).

Published works

 Kratkočasna matematika (Maths for Fun), 1951
 Križem kražem po matematiki (Criss Cross Across Maths), 1960
 Elektronski aritmetični računalniki (Electronic Calculators), 1960
 Vektorji, matrike, tenzorji (Vectors, Matrices, Tensors), 1962
 Aritmetika, algebra in analiza – I.del (Arithmetics, Algebra and Analysis – Part I.), 1963
 Aritmetika, algebra in analiza – II.del (Arithmetics, Algebra and Analysis – Part II.), 1964
 Aritmetika, algebra in analiza – III.del (Arithmetics, Algebra and Analysis – Part III.), 1964
 Aritmetika, algebra in analiza – IV.del (Arithmetics, Algebra and Analysis – Part IV.), 1964
 Operatorski račun in integralske transformacije (Operational Calculus and Integral Transforms), 1965
 Vektorska in tenzorska analiza (Vector and Tensor Analysis), 1966
 Linearna algebra in linearna analiza (Linear Algebra and Linear Analysis), 1969
 Funkcije več kompleksnih spremenljivk (Functions of Complex Numbers), 1971
 Dinamični sistemi (Dynamical Systems), 1972
 Topološke grupe (Topological Groups), 1974
 Navadne diferencialne enačbe in variacijski račun (Ordinary Differential Equations and Variational Calculus), 1974
 Liejeve grupe (Lie groups), 1976
 Liejeve algebra (Lie Algebra), 1978
 Linearna algebra (Linear Algebra), 1978
 Matematika – prvo berilo (Mathematics – First Year Textbook), 1981
 Matematika – drugo berilo (Mathematics – Second Year Textbook), 1981
 Matematika – tretje berilo (Mathematics – Third Year Textbook), 1983
 Matematika – četrto berilo (Mathematics – Fourth Year Textbook), 1985
 Linearna analiza na grupah (Linear Analysis on Groups), 1982
 Nihalo, prostor in delci (The pendulum, Space and Particles), 1982
 Temelji realne matematične analize (The Foundation of Real Mathematical Analysis), 1990
 Linearna algebra in linearna analiza (Linear Algebra and Linear Analysis), 1993
 Vektorska in tenzorska analiza – abeceda globalne analize (Vector and Tensor Analysis – the Alphabet of Global Analysis), 1996
 Splošno in posebno : (nakladanja in otepanja) (General and Specific Stuff : Collection of Notes), published posthumously 2003

References 

1928 births
2002 deaths
20th-century Slovenian mathematicians
People from Maribor
Levstik Award laureates
University of Ljubljana alumni
Academic staff of the University of Ljubljana
Yugoslav mathematicians